Hednota asterias is a moth in the family Crambidae. It was described by Edward Meyrick in 1887, after the species was found in Australia.

References

Crambinae
Moths described in 1887